Laszlo Szapáry (12 July 1910 – 22 July 1998) was an Austrian sports shooter. He competed at the 1952 Summer Olympics, 1960 Summer Olympics and 1964 Summer Olympics.

References

1910 births
1998 deaths
Austrian male sport shooters
Olympic shooters of Austria
Shooters at the 1952 Summer Olympics
Shooters at the 1960 Summer Olympics
Shooters at the 1964 Summer Olympics
People from Altmünster
Sportspeople from Upper Austria
20th-century Austrian people